Lester Johnson (January 27, 1919 – May 30, 2010) was an American artist and educator. Johnson was a member of the Second Generation of the New York School during the late 1950s. The subject of much of his work is the human figure. His style is considered by critics and art historians to be in the figurative expressionist mode.

Biography
Lester Johnson was born in 1919 in Minneapolis, Minnesota. From 1942 to 1947, he attended the Minneapolis School of Art, where he studied under Alexander Masley, a former student of Hans Hofmann in Munich, Germany.

Johnson moved to New York City in 1947. His first studio and apartment was on 6th Street and Avenue A, next door to the painter Wolf Kahn. His next residence and workspace was a loft on St. Marks Place that he shared with Larry Rivers. In 1949, Johnson married Josephine Valenti, an art historian, and moved into a house on 2nd Ave and 2nd Street, which the couple shared with Kahn. In 1961, Johnson briefly left the city for an artist-in-residence position at Ohio State University. Upon returning to New York City, Johnson shared a studio with the painter Philip Pearlstein. In 1964, Johnson was invited by Abstract Expressionist painter Jack Tworkov to teach at Yale, where he served as the Director of Studies Graduate Painting from 1969 to 1974. Johnson retired from teaching at the Yale School of Art and Architecture in 1989.

Exhibitions 
In New York, Johnson exhibited at the Martha Jackson Gallery, Zabriskie Gallery, Gimpel & Weitzenhoffer, and James Goodman Gallery. He has also been exhibited at several museums, including group shows at the Solomon R. Guggenheim, The Whitney, Museum of Modern Art, and Metropolitan Museum of Art. He was elected a member to both the American Academy of Arts & Letters and National Academy of Design. Throughout his career, Lester exhibited extensively with Donald Morris Gallery in Detroit, Michigan and with David Klein Gallery in Birmingham, Michigan.

Notable dates
 1947  Came to New York
 1961–62  Artist-in-residence, Ohio State University, Columbus, Ohio
 1964  Summer artist-in-residence, University of Wisconsin–Milwaukee, Milwaukee, Wisconsin
 1964–89  Professor (Adjunct) of Painting, Yale University, New Haven, Connecticut
 1969–74  Director of Studies, Graduate Painting, School of Art and Architecture, Yale University, New Haven, Connecticut

Awards and prizes
 2004              Elected Member, American Academy of Arts and Letters
 2003              American Academy of Arts and Letters, Jimmy Ernst Award
 1987              Elected Associate, National Academy of Design
 1987              Brandeis University, Creative Arts Award for Painting
 1973              Guggenheim Fellowship
 1961              Longview Fellowship Massachusetts Institute of Technology
 1942              Midwestern Artists Competition 1st prize
 1941              St. Paul Gallery Scholarship
 1940–41        The President’s Scholarship Minneapolis School of Fine Arts
 1939              Alfred Pillsbury Scholarship

Selected public collections
 Baltimore Museum of Art, Baltimore, MD
 Albright-Knox Art Gallery, Buffalo, NY
 Fogg Art Museum, Harvard University
 Art Institute of Chicago, Chicago, IL 
 Detroit Institute of Arts, Detroit, MI
 Kalamazoo Institute of Arts 
 Modern Art Museum of Fort Worth, Fort Worth, TX
 Wadsworth Atheneum, Hartford, CT
 Minneapolis Institute of Arts
 The Walker Art Center, Minneapolis, MN
 Yale University Art Gallery, New Haven, CT
 Museum of Modern Art, New York, NY
 Metropolitan Museum of Art, New York, NY
 Whitney Museum of American Art, New York, NY
 Solomon R. Guggenheim Museum, New York, NY
 Chrysler Museum of Art, Norfolk, VA
 Carnegie Museum of Art, Pittsburgh, PA
 Museum of Art, Rhode Island School of Design, Providence, RI
 Aldrich Contemporary Art Museum, Ridgefield, CT
 Rose Art Museum, Brandeis University
 Hirshhorn Museum and Sculpture Garden, Washington, DC.
 Smithsonian American Art Museum, Washington, DC.

References

Suggested reading
 Sandler, Irving H. The New York School: The Painters and Sculptors of the Fifties, New York: Harper & Row, 1978. 
 Schimmel, Paul and Stein, Judith E., The Figurative fifties: New York figurative expressionism: New York: Rizzoli, 1988.

External links
 Detailed list of exhibitions http://www.procuniarworkshop.com/biography-of/lester-johnson.html
 James Goodman Gallery https://web.archive.org/web/20110713075056/http://www.jamesgoodmangallery.com/artists_bio.cfm?fid=199
 Denise Cade Gallery http://www.denisecadegallery.com/artist-johnson.php
 New York Times Obituary https://www.nytimes.com/2010/06/09/arts/design/09johnson.html?src=me
 Star Tribune Obituary http://www.startribune.com/entertainment/art/95982914.html?elr=KArks7PYDiaK7DUqEiaDUiD3aPc%3A_Yyc%3AaUU
Lester Johnson online

1919 births
2010 deaths
Artists from Minneapolis
Abstract expressionist artists
20th-century American painters
American male painters
21st-century American painters
21st-century American male artists
National Academy of Design members
People from Springs, New York
20th-century American male artists
Members of the American Academy of Arts and Letters